Justice Foster may refer to:

Arthur B. Foster, associate justice of the Alabama Supreme Court
Dwight Foster (politician, born 1828), judge of the Massachusetts Supreme Judicial Court
Enoch Foster, justice of the Supreme Judicial Court of Maine
Harry Ellsworth Foster, associate justice of the Washington Supreme Court
Henry A. Foster, ex officio judge of the New York Court of Appeals
Lafayette S. Foster, associate justice of the Connecticut Supreme Court
Peter Foster (judge), justice of the High Court of justice of England
Robert Foster (judge), chief justice of the King's Bench.
Sydney F. Foster, judge of the New York Court of Appeals
William Lawrence Foster, associate justice of the New Hampshire Supreme Court
William P. Foster (jurist), associate justice of the Supreme Court of Illinois